The 1968 Speedway World Pairs Championship was the unofficial FIM Speedway World Pairs Championship. The final took place in Kempten, West Germany. The championship was won by Sweden (24 points) who beat Great Britain (21 points) and Norway (16 points). Although unofficial at the time it is now regarded as being a major event and is listed in all speedway lists.

Final
  Kempten
 September 1

See also
 1968 Individual Speedway World Championship
 1968 Speedway World Team Cup
 motorcycle speedway
 1968 in sports

References

1968
World Pairs